Giuseppe Peroni (6 May 1700 – 22 September 1776) was an Italian painter of the Baroque period.

Biography
He was born and died in Parma, where he is said to have studied under Ilario Spolverini. He then moved to Bologna and attended the Accademia Clementina, where he would have worked under the masters Ercole Lelli, Felice Torelli, and Donato Creti, then moved to Rome to work with Agostino Masucci. He painted in the pre-eminent style of his time, the grand manner of Carlo Maratta. In Rome, In 1738, Giuseppe was able to garner a first prize for painting submitted to an exhibition at the Accademia di San Luca. He also became a priest by 1744. Returning to Parma, he became active in teaching at the local Academy of Fine Arts (founded 1757) and painting mostly altarpieces for churches.

He painted a The Magdalene at the feet of Christ (1757) for the Certosa di Pavia, St Camillo de Lellis for the church of Santa Maria della Visitazione (Chiesa della Madonnina) in Ferrara. He painted a Marriage of the Virgin for the Cathedral of Santa Maria del Popolo in Pontremoli. In Parma, he painted frescoes for the church of San Vitale, a St John the Baptist for the no longer extant church of San Cecilia, a canvas of St Francesco di Sales for the church of San Giuseppe, and a Martyrdom of San Bartolomeo for the church of San Bartolomeo. He painted two altarpieces for the church of San Vitale in Sala Baganza. He also painted frescoes in the Savoy castle of Casotto in Garessio. He also painted for churches in Turin.

In Parma, his pupils included Domenico Muzzi and Gaetano Callani.

References

1700 births
1776 deaths
18th-century Italian painters
Italian male painters
Italian Baroque painters
Painters from Parma
18th-century Italian male artists